Phaenacropista is a genus of moths belonging to the subfamily Tortricinae of the family Tortricidae.

Species
Phaenacropista compsa Diakonoff, 1983
Phaenacropista cremnotoma (Meyrick, 1936)

See also
List of Tortricidae genera

References

External links
tortricidae.com

Archipini
Tortricidae genera